"Centuries" is a song by American rock band Fall Out Boy, released September 9, 2014 as the lead single from their sixth studio album, American Beauty/American Psycho (2015). It was co-written by Fall Out Boy, with two producers. A gladiator-themed music video was created for the song. The single reached number 10 on the US Billboard Hot 100 and was certified quadruple Platinum by the RIAA. It reached first position on the UK Rock and Metal Chart. The song was also the band's fourth top ten hit and first in eight years, since "This Ain't a Scene, It's an Arms Race" in 2007. In 2015, "Centuries" was nominated for the Kerrang! Award for Best Single. Fall Out Boy has played the song numerous times on televised performances and was used as ESPN's official theme song for sports coverage.

Background
"Centuries" was written by Pete Wentz, Patrick Stump, Joe Trohman, Andy Hurley, J.R. Rotem, Justin Tranter, Raja Kumari and Julian Lennartz in mid-2014 and was produced by Omega and Rotem. Stump originally came forward with the song while Fall Out Boy were on the Monumentour tour with fellow American band Paramore. In an interview with Kerrang!, Wentz described the idea of the song as a "David vs. Goliath story", stating "We wanted to write a song that empowered people who are a little weird." Tranter later confirmed the song was partially inspired by Marsha P. Johnson.

"Centuries" contains part of the melody from the song "Tom's Diner" by DNA featuring Suzanne Vega. The segment is not a sample, but instead an interpolation as it was actually re-recorded by American singer Lolo for the track. Stump described the inclusion as "a tip of the hat" to "Tom's Diner", a song which the band wanted to "re-inject" into popular culture. Vega is credited as a co-writer for "Centuries." "Centuries" is written in the key of E minor.

Release
Days after the ending of co-headlining the Monumentour tour with Paramore, on September 4, 2014, Fall Out Boy released a teaser video depicting the title of the song in Morse code. "Centuries" received its worldwide premiere on BBC Radio 1 on September 8, 2014, before being released worldwide the next day. The song is featured as the second track of Now! 54 (2015).

Critical reception

"Centuries" has received favorable reviews from music critics. MTV described the song as "The ultimate battle cry of a track".

Music video
The official music video, which features the band members in a gladiator-style battle, and a cameo from rapper Rick Ross, was released on October 17, 2014. The video features strong Christian imagery and thematic elements, including a scene of a crucified figure, a cross in place of the "T" in the song title, the use of a sling against a "giant" (in reference to the Hebrew story of David and Goliath), and an angelic figure depicted as a human with white wings. The "giant" is portrayed by Canadian actor Jon Ambrose, and the band's gladiator doubles were Simu Liu, Ben Devries, Sebastian Deery  and Paul Ebejer.  "Centuries" was shot on-site at Fort Henry National Historic Site in Kingston, Ontario, Canada. Prior to the release of an official music video, Fall Out Boy released a video for "Centuries" filmed in Chicago featuring the use of the mobile app Hyperlapse on September 8, 2014.

The official video features four gladiators doomed for some unknown reason prior to entering the Colosseum in Rome for the entertainment of the crowds. They are given two lengths of rope, a cloth, and a stone by a mysterious cloaked figure. This is followed by scenes of a woman styled as the Virgin Mary opening her arms to a crowd, another woman with two lions behind her, a "Christ" figure, and a decadent emperor spreading his arms showing several women sitting at his feet. The ostensible "crowd favourite", a large, muscular man, easily defeats the four, cheered on by the crowd and their laughing emperor. In desperation, the four, having realized that they need to work together, combine their items into a sling, which is then used to slay the warrior. The video ends as another, unknown challenger enters the ring while the emperor laughs.

Commercial performance
"Centuries" debuted at No. 22 on the US Billboard Hot 100 and No. 4 on Digital Songs with 133,000 first week sales. It also opened at No. 2 on Hot Rock Songs and No. 14 on Alternative Songs. "Centuries" peaked at No. 4 on Alternative Songs in December on strong airplay, the band's third highest position on that chart behind "Dance, Dance" and "Sugar, We're Goin Down". As a cross-over radio success, it reached No. 16 on mainstream Pop Songs by January 2015. In its nineteenth week on the Hot 100, it reached No. 12, selling 111,000 downloads that week, and propelling the band to No. 10 on the Artist 100. It eventually peaked at No. 10 on the Billboard Hot 100 in its 20th week (week ending February 7, 2015; the same as American Beauty/American Psycho'''s debut), becoming the band's first top 10 in almost eight years after "This Ain't A Scene, It's An Arms Race" peaked at No. 2 in February 2007; "Centuries" also reached a new high of No. 15 on Pop Songs. In its 21st week, it held at No. 10 on the Hot 100 and reached No. 13 on both Pop and Adult Pop with heavy airplay. It became their fourth and last top ten hit in the US.

"Centuries" has spent twelve consecutive weeks in the top 20 of the Hot 100 and twenty-two consecutive frames at No. 2 on Hot Rock Songs.Fall Out Boy - Centuries. acharts.us. Retrieved March 7, 2015. It was certified 2× Platinum by the RIAA in December 2014 and was upgraded to 4× Platinum in October 2015. In Australia, the song debuted at No. 59 but rose to No. 55 in the following week. "Centuries" debuted at No. 36 on the Canadian Hot 100 and peaked at No. 26 in its fifteenth week. In the UK, "Centuries" made its appearance in the UK top 40 singles chart at No. 22, scoring the band another top 40 hit. On the singles sales format of the chart, the song reached No. 12. As of June 2015, the song has spent 21 weeks in the UK top 100 and has been certified Silver by the BPI, denoting 200,000 copies.

Media usage and live performances

On September 10, 2014, ESPN announced "Centuries" as a promotional song for its coverage of the inaugural College Football Playoff. The song was featured across promotions for the event throughout the 2014 college football season, and during coverage of the semi-final and national championship games. In a January 2015 interview with FoxSports.com, the band apologized for ESPN's overexposure of the song; it was estimated that across its coverage of the two semi-final bowls, along with the National Championship game, that "Centuries" had been played a total of 45 times.

Fall Out Boy performed "Centuries" live for the first time on Jimmy Kimmel Live! on September 17, 2014. They next played on The Ellen DeGeneres Show with Suzanne Vega as a special guest on October 29, 2014.

"Centuries" was used by WWE as the official theme song for Friday Night SmackDown's 15th anniversary show. "Centuries" was also performed at the 2015 NHL All-Star game at Nationwide Arena, Columbus, Ohio in between periods. On April 5, 2015, the band performed "Centuries" as part of pre-game festivities at Wrigley Field in their hometown of Chicago for the opening game of the 2015 Major League Baseball season; the performance was televised by ESPN2 as part of its coverage. "Centuries" was performed at the 2015 MTV Movie Awards on April 12, 2015. "Centuries" was also used for an intro video of the 2015 Chicago White Sox season home games and Calgary Flames playoff home games.

"Centuries" was used by Apple during the pre-keynote for WWDC 2015.

"Centuries" is frequently played  at A-League team Adelaide United home games.

"Centuries" is featured in Rock Band 4''.

"Centuries" also used in the trailer for Nickelodeon's original movie inspired by mid-90s game show Legends of the Hidden Temple.

Track listing
 Digital download
 "Centuries" – 3:48
 "Centuries" (Remix) (featuring Juicy J) – 3:28

Charts

Weekly charts

Year-end charts

Decade-end charts

Certifications

Release history

References

External links
 Full Lyrics of "Centuries" at DirectLyrics
 

2014 songs
2014 singles
Fall Out Boy songs
Songs written by Pete Wentz
Songs written by Patrick Stump
Songs written by Joe Trohman
Songs written by Andy Hurley
Island Records singles
Songs written by J. R. Rotem
Song recordings produced by J. R. Rotem
Songs written by Justin Tranter
WWE SmackDown